Oltre - un mondo uomo sotto un cielo mago, simply known as Oltre, is the eleventh studio album by Italian songwriter Claudio Baglioni, released on 17 November 1990 by CBS Italiana, a subsidiary label of CBS Records International. The album is characterized by world music features and it was recorded in the Real World Studios of English songwriter Peter Gabriel and in several European recording studios. Baglioni defined the album as the first of a trilogy about time: Oltre represents the past, Io sono qui is the present and Viaggiatore sulla coda del tempo represents the future.

The concept album divided critics due to its complexity and completely different format respect the previous works by Baglioni.

Recording 

In summer 1988, Baglioni began to compose a new album three years later the release of La vita è adesso. First recording sessions were made in the Real World Studios near Bath, under the direction of Celso Valli and Pasquale Mineri, while Peter Gabriel was recording his soundtrack for The Last Temptation of Christ.

On Topolino n. 1703, Baglioni implicitly revealed in an interview that his new album would be entitled A presto. Mineri said in an interview:

On the following 8 September, the Italian leg of worldwide tour Human Rights Now! was held in Turin and Baglioni took part as the local guest, but during his show a small group of hooligans near the stage began to boo and throw objects against him, because they considered the songwriter as not touched by the thematics and as out of place in a humanitarian concert leaded by Bruce Springsteen, Sting and Peter Gabriel, despite Baglioni had sung songs adhering to the meaning of the event and, during the interview before the concert, he declared to be interested only for the cause of the event.

However, the controversy provoked a huge shock in Baglioni, who did not organized any new concert, and he continued to work on the album. In October 1989, presales of the album began with the temporary title Un mondo più uomo sotto un cielo mago ("A more human world under a wizard sky"). There were gossips saying that Baglioni was not convinced about the album and had begun to rewrite all the songs, forcing CBS to postpone the release to 1990.

Meanwhile, recording session proceeded in different studios located in Europe, with the collaboration of international artists and collaborators of Peter Gabriel, like Tony Levin and Manu Katché, as well as Italian stars like Pino Daniele and Mia Martini. Spanish guitarist Paco de Lucía and Senegalese singer Youssou N'Dour took part to the project. Artists contributed with their native culture and music, giving to the album an ethnic sound.

Composition 
Oltre is a concept album which follows the story of the alter ego Cucaio, his maturation and his search for himself. The name of the character is inspired by the bad pronunciation that Baglioni had of his name when he was a little child. The songwriter said:

Along with the album, there is a little booklet with a stream of consciousness through which the author explains the Gusci ("Shells") containing meaning of the songs.

Disc one 
Side A
Dagli il via - In this first track, Baglioni narrates his past with memories appearing without any order, together with questions, lost opportunities, forgotten loves. In the chorus he gives the start to a run for his freedom and his will to find his own destiny and those of the listener. The man running at the beginning of the song is Walter Savelli, the pianist of Baglioni.
Io dal mare - The sea is depicted as the mother of Cucaio and the whole humanity, giving a visual suggestion. The arpeggio at the beginning of the track was created by David Sancious during a pause from his work with Gabriel for The Last Temptation of Christ, while Pino Daniele contributed with his guitar and style. Manieri said that Pino Daniele wanted to do "that stuff with Claudio" before a surgery to his heart, and the group was temporarily moved to Formia to record the song. In an interview for the journal Chitarre, Baglioni said:

Naso di falco - The main theme is the moment when man becomes aware to have a dream, while he is looking for himself. The song begins with the depiction of a curious newborn hawk asking the same ingenuous questions that Baglioni asked when he was a child. These kind of questions are alternated with more mature and unanswered ones related to events like the Ustica Massacre in 1980, Timișoara alleged repression in 1989, Colombian conflict, Chernobyl disaster in 1986, and the Heysel Stadium disaster in 1985. At the end, the hawk flies to a place "where a dream is still free and air is not ash".
 Io lui e la cana femmina - It is dedicated to the two German Shepherd dogs owned by Baglioni: he describes them as if they are human beings with whom stroll around, dreaming to be free and without inhibitions like an animal, to be the same. The song features the French musician Richard Galliano with his accordion.

 Stelle di stelle - Baglioni talks about TV and music "stars"  of the past whose art continues to live, like the light of stars reaches Earth despite they died millions or billions of years ago due to immense distances in the Universe. The atmosphere is intimate and music is minimal. Mia Martini contributed with his voice and during a 1992 interview for RadioVerdeRai she said:

Side B
 Vivi - The song tells the story of an ended love which is not bright as once, but with the desire to become so. It depicts the fury of the will to live. The lyrics has a marked erotic tone and exalts life and sensual passion with the relations between the four elements (Earth, Air, Water and Fire) conceived by pre-Socratic philosophers, as well as the cycle of life. Song ends with a succession of ethnic groups (Ainu, Akha, Lacandon, Tasaday, Nambikwara, Gond, Māori, Maasai, Kuna, Hopi, Yanomani, Semang, Onge, Kogi, Waorani, Penan, Caingua, Vedda, Sammi, Caraja, Inuit, Indigenous Australians, Tuareg, Jurana). The track features the purva melakarta succession of Indian carnatic music.
 Le donne sono - Baglioni describes the interaction of men with women and he proposes a series of portraits of women depicted with admiration, irony, affection and perplexity.  The song concludes depicting men as sailors in an ocean of women that they will not never understand.
 Domani mai - The theme of physical love returns, but this time the song depicts the lament for a future breakup of a couple due to an impossible relationship between the lovers. Paco de Lucìa plays the guitar giving a Spanish atmosphere: during the preparation of the album, de Lucìa studied the sheet for a week and returned to the recording studio with his ideas for the song. Baglioni said about him:

Acqua dalla luna - The song depicts the desire to enchant the audience like a magician or a circus artist and to amaze in particular who is sad, less fortunate or people marginalized for an alleged oddity. The surreal circus of the song has a Fellinian atmosphere and it is full of weird characters (like an unbalanced tightrope walker, a defeated tamer and a mute storyteller), seen by Baglioni with the eyes of a child. A final reflection suggests that it would be nice if artists were allowed to alleviate every kind of sorrow or pain, but it is as impossible as to find fluid water on the Moon.
Tamburi lontani - Introduced by horns of the London Symphony Orchestra, the song talks about the pain of living. Each person has an own drum, rhythm and singing with which human relations occur. The rhythm in particular has strict bonds with vital pulsations (like the heartbeat) and cycles of Earth (like the alternation of seasons). Baglioni asks a confirm to his interlocutor on the fact that time, despite all odds, has not provoked a definitive departure between each other, and it is related to the separation between his wife, Paola Massari, and his son, Giovanni. At the end, time shows itself again as powerful and indifferent towards human unhappiness, but at the same time there is a drive for rebellion against this condition.

Disc two 
Side A
 Noi no - This song has the attitude of a collective singing which becomes more evident during a concert, where public is directly involved in the performance. It is an anthem dedicated to rebels fighting against injustices, to anyone who wants a better future for himself, future generations and the entire world.
 Signora delle ore scure - The "Lady of dark hours" to whom Baglioni refers is unknown: she is described as a young woman living in the night, maybe from a distant tropical country, and the desire for her is sinful.
 Navigando - A playful romance with a female figure is compared with the sailing of seas. The sailor shipwrecks among beauties from all the world, as if each woman has the beauty of all the women in the world. Baglioni reprises the melakarta from Vivi when he describes somatic features of exotic women, and at the end he realizes he had been like "Odysseus, Sinbad and Gilgamesh": the songwriter has lost himself in his voyage and when the love ends he is alone "like a wolf in the lair". Richard Galliano plays again the accordion.

Le mani e l’anima - The songs is dedicated to the drama of whom leaves his mainland in order to find a redemption in another country, describing in particular the African roots of men, with parallelism between body parts and natural elements typical of the African environment. The lyric self wants back his hands and soul, his "African soul" (Africanima) and his body by synecdoche, because Africa is the soul of the whole world. At the end, Italian pejorative way mocking the stereotypical accent of African peddlers is used to spell phrases of resignation (like Che vù campà, Che vù parlà and Che vù tornà) overcomed by African rhythm, meaning that Africans has to claim the right to be not considered as inferior or culturally underdeveloped and the right to consider Africa as mother and soul of the entire world.  Instrumental track was composed in the Real World Studios, while voices were recorded in Rome. Senegalese songwriter and mbalax pioneer Youssou N'Dour took part to the choirs:
Mille giorni di te e di me - The story of an ended love story lasted about three years, when each one goes towards those who will teach what they have learned together, dreaming of that "moment of eternal" which has never been realized between the lovers. Causes of split up are initially not clearly revealed, but the lyric self considered love as a shelter from the world and he tries to imagine a new relationship which would however had scars of the one ended. With the final salute to the former girlfriend, the lyric self delivers the memory of himself to who would be his substitute. In an interview with Italian journalist Vincenzo Mollica, Baglioni said:

Side B
 Dov’è dov’è - After an introduction of Italian actor Oreste Lionello who describes the moral decline of society, Baglioni compares himself with the child he was, when he ran from attentions of his relatives, and the grown-up himself who runs away from Paparazzi, fans, family and the world. Everyone is desperately looking for him like in a search of a fugitive criminal. It features actual voices of parents, former teachers and his wife, telling in choirs the character of the child Baglioni. At the end, the "criminal" is caught and took to process and events of his private life become a sort of accusation by meddlesome people.
Tieniamente - It is dedicated to the events of 1989 Tiananmen Square protests and the title is a pun between "Tienanmen" and Tieni a mente ("Keep in mind"), appealing to not forget what happened.
 Qui Dio non c’è - The song depicts the rage and suffering (both personal and collective) provoked by all wrong and evil things in the world, where maybe there is not any God despite He should have realized himself in nature.
 La piana dei cavalli bradi - The song begins with a natural atmosphere of horses running freely on plains, and then lyrics describes the distance between two lovers: probably, it refers to the two-years retirement of Baglioni in Ansedonia to compose music for the album, isolating himself from everyone. The lyric self accepts and waits its future, like horses in stables waiting to run. Finally, man could find his inner peace in that waiting and he begins to run towards "the plain of wild horses". In an interview for Rai Radio 2, Baglioni declared that he was inspired by the Plateaus of Castelluccio, in Umbria:

Pace - In the final song of the album, the author makes pace with himself, his child self and with all the world: he is now an adult and he has find by himself that heart in this world so similar to human beings, under a sky tricking us like a magician. After saluting Cucaio, the lyric self declares to have become free, a "Beyond-Man" similar to the Nietzschean Übermensch.

Release 
In October 1990, the second stereophonic radio station of RAI, RaiStereoDue, aired the first two tracks of the album one month before the official release.

On the following 4 November, Claudio Baglioni had a serious car accident with his Porsche, having injuries on his hands and face, including the tongue. Medical bulletins confirmed later that the surgery would not hinder his musical career. On 15 November, Baglioni was the only guest of Maurizio Costanzo Show on Canale 5, publicly appearing for the first time after the incident.

On 17 November 1990, after three years since its announcement, the album was finally released in Italy with the title Oltre - un mondo uomo sotto un cielo mago was finally released in Italy and in 1991 the album was sold in all Europe (mainly in Spain, France and Germany) and America (Northern and Southern).

In February 1991, CBS declared that the album sold more than 900 000 copies in Italy.
It sold more than 6 million copies in the world.

Reception 

Oltre surprised Italian music critics and journalists. In a review for TV Sorrisi e Canzoni, composer Ennio Morricone wrote:

Critic Gino Castaldo wrote on La Repubblica:

Track listing 
 Disc 1

 Disc 2

Personnel 
Credits from the booklet.
 Claudio Baglioni - lead vocals, piano
 Steve Ferrone - drums
 David Rhodes - guitar
 Walter Savelli: piano, backing vocals
 Paolo Gianolio: guitar
 Simon Clark: piano
 Charlie Morgan: drums
 Celso Valli: piano and keyboards
 Frank Ricotti: percussions
 Phil Palmer: guitar
 Danny Cummings: percussions
 Danilo Rea: piano, backing vocals
 Pino Daniele: guitar
 Tony Levin: bass
 Paco de Lucía: guitar
 David Sancious: keyboard
 Pino Palladino: bass
 Richard Galliano: accordion
 Nick Glennie-Smith: keyboard
 Manu Katché: drums
 John Giblin: bass
 Hossam Ramzy: percussions
 Marcello Bono: hurdy-gurdy
 Danny Thompson: double bass
 Didier Lockwood: violin
 Paola Massari, Claudio Mattone, Ida Baldi, Piero Montanari, Rossella Corsi, Susan Duncan Smith, Franco Novaro, Livio Macoratti, Roberta Longhi, Matteo Montanari, Massimiliano Savaiano: backing vocals

Credits 
 Written and produced by Claudio Baglioni
 Arranged and directed by Celso Valli
 Supervised by Pasquale Minieri
 Recorded by Stuart Bruce, Mark Chamberlain, Graham Dickson, Claude Grilles, Maurizio Maggi, Paul Mortimer and Eddy Offord;
 Mixed by Pasquale Minieri, Graham Dickson and Mark Chamberlain
 Mastered by Tim Young

See also 

 Claudio Baglioni
 World music

References

Bibliography

External links 
 
 
 
 
 

1990 albums
Concept albums
Pop albums by Italian artists
World music albums by Italian artists